The fine side-lined ctenotus (Ctenotus dux)  is a species of skink found in Northern Territory, South Australia, and Western Australia.

References

dux
Reptiles described in 1969
Taxa named by Glen Milton Storr